Andrew J. Morrison School is a historic school located in the Olney neighborhood of Philadelphia, Pennsylvania. It functions as a K–8 school under the School District of Philadelphia. The building was designed by Irwin T. Catharine and built in 1922–1924. It is a three-story, red brick building on a raised basement in a Late Gothic Revival / Tudor Revival-style. It features carved stone decorative panels and a projecting two-story stone bay.

The building was added to the National Register of Historic Places in 1988.

References

External links

School buildings on the National Register of Historic Places in Philadelphia
Gothic Revival architecture in Pennsylvania
School buildings completed in 1924
Olney-Oak Lane, Philadelphia
Public K–8 schools in Philadelphia
School District of Philadelphia
1924 establishments in Pennsylvania